Avalanche Lake is located in Glacier National Park, in the U. S. state of Montana. Avalanche Lake is southwest of Bearhat Mountain and receives meltwater from Sperry Glacier. Avalanche Lake is a  hike from the trailhead along the Trail of the Cedars. When measured in August 1910, the maximum depth of the lake was 63 feet near the upper end.

History

Avalanche Lake was named in 1895 by a party including Dr. Lyman Sperry, namesake of the Sperry Glacier, who witnessed many avalanches during their stay.

Nature

Though most lakes of similar size and elevation in Glacier National Park do not have fish, Avalanche Lake is a popular fishing location among anglers. Yellowstone cutthroat trout are native to the lake.

See also
List of lakes in Flathead County, Montana (A-L)

References

External links

Lakes of Glacier National Park (U.S.)
Lakes of Flathead County, Montana